William R. Cruse was an American football and college basketball coach. He served as the head football coach (1921) and head men's basketball coach (1922 to 1923) at Central College in Pella, Iowa.

A graduate of the University of Michigan, Cruse was a member of the national championship 1918 Michigan Wolverines football team under Fielding H. Yost.

References

Year of birth missing
Year of death missing
Michigan Wolverines football players
Central Dutch athletic directors
Central Dutch football coaches
Central Dutch men's basketball coaches